Front Money is an album by saxophonist David Newman recorded in 1977 and released on the Warner Bros. label.

Track listing 
All compositions by David "Fathead" Newman except where noted
 "Amazing Grace" (Traditional) – 5:06
 "Sneakin' In" – 6:44
 "Still Hard" – 6:12
 "Front Money" (Claude Johnson) – 4:58
 "Pharoah's Gold" (Johnson) – 5:16
 "So Fine – So Fine" (Roger Boykin) – 6:04
 "Suki Duki" (Boykin) – 4:50

Personnel 
David Newman – tenor saxophone, alto saxophone, soprano saxophone, flute, vocals, arranger
Roger Boykin – bass, guitar, arranger
William Richardson – drums, percussion
Claude Johnson – piano, baritone saxophone, arranger
Adolpho Washington – congas
Cleveland Gay – trombone
Arnold Blair – vocals (tracks 1 & 6)

References 

David "Fathead" Newman albums
1977 albums
Warner Records albums
Albums produced by Joel Dorn